Pamphagidae is a family of grasshoppers belonging to the superfamily Acridoidea.  The species in this family can be found in Africa, Europe and Asia.

Subfamilies, Tribes and selected Genera
The Orthoptera Species File lists the following:

Akicerinae
Auth.: Bolívar, 1916 – southern Africa; all genera:
tribe Akicerini Bolívar, 1916 (monotypic)
 Akicera Serville, 1831
Incertae sedis
 Adephagus Saussure, 1887
 Batrachornis Saussure, 1884
 Batrachotetrix Burmeister, 1838
 Eremotettix Saussure, 1888

Echinotropinae
Auth.: Dirsh, 1961 – southern Africa; all genera:
 Echinotropis Uvarov, 1944
 Geloiomimus Saussure, 1899
 Parageloiomimus Dirsh, 1961
 Thrincotropis Saussure, 1899

Pamphaginae
Auth.: Burmeister, 1840 – northern Africa, Europe, W. Asia; selected genera:

tribe Euryparyphini La Greca, 1993
 Eunapiodes Bolívar, 1907
 Euryparyphes Fischer, 1853
tribe Finotiini Bolívar, 1916 (monotypic)
 Finotia Bonnet, 1884
tribe Nocarodeini Bolívar, 1916
 Nocarodes Fischer von Waldheim, 1846
tribe Pamphagini Burmeister, 1840
 Acinipe Rambur, 1838
 Pamphagus Thunberg, 1815
 Paracinipe Descamps & Mounassif, 1972
tribe Tropidauchenini Zhang, Yin & Yin, 2003
 Tropidauchen Saussure, 1887
Incertae sedis
 Acrostira Enderlein, 1929

Porthetinae
Auth.: Bolívar, 1916 – S. to E Africa, Middle East; selected genera:
tribe Trachypetrellini Uvarov, 1943 (monotypic)
 Trachypetrella Kirby, 1910
Incertae sedis
 Lamarckiana Kirby, 1910
 Lobosceliana Dirsh, 1958
 Pagopedilum Karsch, 1896
 Xiphoceriana Dirsh, 1958

Thrinchinae
Auth.: Stål, 1876 – northern Africa, Europe, temperate Asia; selected genera:
tribe Haplotropidini Sergeev, 1995
 Haplotropis Saussure, 1888
tribe Thrinchini Stål, 1876
 Iranotmethis Uvarov, 1943
 Prionotropis Fieber, 1853
 Thrinchus Fischer von Waldheim, 1833

References

External links

 
Orthoptera families
Taxa named by Hermann Burmeister